Washington Township is one of thirteen townships in Putnam County, Indiana. As of the 2010 census, its population was 2,493 and it contained 1,086 housing units.

History
The Putnam County Bridge No. 159 and Lycurgus Stoner House are listed on the National Register of Historic Places.

Geography

Unincorporated towns
 Cagle Mill at 
 Hirt Corner at 
 Manhattan at 
 Pleasant Gardens at 
 Raab Crossroads at 
 Reelsville at 
(This list is based on USGS data and may include former settlements.)

References

External links
 Indiana Township Association
 United Township Association of Indiana

Townships in Putnam County, Indiana
Townships in Indiana